Robinsonekspedisjonen: 2004, was the sixth season of the Norwegian version of the Swedish show Expedition Robinson which premiered on 5 September 2004 and aired until 4 December 2004. 

The sixth season started with the contestants having to race from off shore to a beach and into a cage with the last person to reach the cage being eliminated. Contestants were then told that they had to stay in the cage until one of them, who would be eliminated, left the cage. These two and all subsequent eliminated contestants were sent to a place called 'Utopia', where they would compete in a duel in order to earn a place in the final four. After the cage challenge the contestants were split into two tribes of nine.

In episode five there was a huge tribal swap in which five of the fifteen remaining contestants swapped tribes. Those who swapped tribes were given immunity at their new tribes first tribal council.

In episode six Rebecca, the person the South team they had just voted out, was able to select someone to be eliminated in her place. She chose Tom 'Piippo' Piippo.

In episode thirteen the remaining members of the merge tribe were put in pairs and told that they would vote and be eliminated in a pair at the next tribal council.

When it came time for the final four, all the eliminated contestants faced off in Utopia. Anne Sivertsen won the duel and was allowed to return to the competition.

Jan Gundersen won the season with an unknown jury vote over Anne Sivertsen.

Finishing order

External links
http://www.dagbladet.no/kultur/2004/12/06/416714.html
http://www.dagbladet.no/arkiv/kolumne/?archive=1001000027225&month=200411&template=kultur
http://www.dagbladet.no/arkiv/kolumne/?archive=1001000027225&month=200410&template=kultur
http://www.dagbladet.no/arkiv/kolumne/?archive=1001000027225&month=200409&template=kultur

 2004
2004 Norwegian television seasons